Mihir Baran Banerjee (M.B. Banerjee) (born 29 March 1943) is an Indian mathematician who specialised in  hydrodynamics and hydromagnetic stability

He was awarded in 1988 the Shanti Swarup Bhatnagar Prize for Science and Technology, the highest science award in India,  in the mathematical sciences category.

References

1943 births
Living people
Himachal Pradesh University
20th-century Indian mathematicians
Recipients of the Shanti Swarup Bhatnagar Award in Mathematical Science